The 1989–90 IHF Women's Cup Winners' Cup was the fourteenth edition of IHF's competition for European women's handball national cup champions.

Rostselmash defeated previous European Cup's semifinalist Debreceni VSC in the final, becoming the second Soviet team to win the Cup Winners' Cup. They previously defeated defending champion Ştiinţa Bacău in the quarterfinals. For the first time in the competition's history, the East German and West German sides, SC Magdeburg and VfL Oldenburg, faced each other, two months after the fall of the Berlin Wall, with Magdeburg making it to the quarterfinals.

Results

References

Women's EHF Cup Winners' Cup
1989 in handball
1990 in handball